is a Japanese former long jumper who competed in the 1952 Summer Olympics and in the 1956 Summer Olympics. His original name was 田島 政次. He is 5 feet and 7 inches (171 cm) tall. He weighs 128 lbs (58 kg).

References

1929 births
Living people
Japanese male long jumpers
Olympic athletes of Japan
Athletes (track and field) at the 1952 Summer Olympics
Athletes (track and field) at the 1956 Summer Olympics
Asian Games medalists in athletics (track and field)
Athletes (track and field) at the 1951 Asian Games
Athletes (track and field) at the 1954 Asian Games
Medalists at the 1951 Asian Games
Medalists at the 1954 Asian Games
Asian Games gold medalists for Japan